Kautokeino Idrettslag is a Norwegian sports club from Kautokeino, Finnmark. It has sections for association football, team handball, floorball and Nordic skiing.

The men's football team currently plays in the Third Division, the fourth tier of Norwegian football. Their current run stretches from 1996 to present. The club has also sent players to the Sápmi football team.

The floorball team is currently heading the 2nd Division.

References

Official site 

Football clubs in Norway
Association football clubs established in 1938
Sport in Finnmark
1938 establishments in Norway